The British fourpence coin, sometimes known as a groat (from Dutch grootpennig = "big penny") or fourpenny bit, was a denomination of sterling coinage worth  of one pound or  of one shilling. The coin was also known as a joey after the MP Joseph Hume, who spoke in favour of its introduction. It was a revival of the pre-Union coin.

Before Decimal Day in 1971, sterling used the Carolingian monetary system, under which the largest unit was a pound divided into 20 shillings, each of 12 pence.

History
The prospect of the introduction of a general circulation fourpence coin was raised in 1835, when the MP Joseph Hume spoke in Parliament in favour of its introduction. His reasoning was that the coin was convenient for paying cab fares. The coin was first introduced in 1836, but proved unpopular with cab drivers as they now simply received a fourpence as payment, whereas previously they would often receive a sixpence without the demand for change.

The threepence was introduced in 1845 to "afford additional convenience for the purpose of change". This new coin proved much more popular than the fourpence, and by the early 1850s it was decided there was no need for both coins. The final regular issue of groats was made in 1855, although proofs were minted in 1857 and 1862. In 1888 a special request was made for a colonial variety to be minted for use in British Guiana and the British West Indies. The groat remained in circulation in British Guiana until that territory adopted the decimal system in 1955.

Design
The original reverse of the 1836 version of the coin, designed by William Wyon, is a seated Britannia, holding a trident, with the words  to each side. Two different obverses were used during the mintage of this coin. Wyon's likeness of William IV appeared in 1836 and 1837, surrounded by the inscription . Groats bearing the likeness of Victoria were issued from late 1837 onwards, also designed by Wyon, with the inscription . Those fourpences minted in 1888 bear the "jubilee head" of Victoria, designed by Joseph Boehm – the reverse is unchanged.

There also exists a pattern coin, dated 1836, which bears the same obverse as the William IV issue coins, but has a different reverse, designed by William Wyon, which has the inscription  instead of the words .

Mintages

References

External links
 Fourpence, Coin Type from United Kingdom - Online Coin Club

Pre-decimalisation coins of the United Kingdom
Coins of the United Kingdom